Constituencies in 1955–1974 | Feb 1974 MPs | Oct 1974 MPs | 1979 MPs | Constituencies in 1983–1997

This is a list of all constituencies that were in existence in the February 1974, October 1974 and 1979 General Elections.



A

B

C

D

E

F

G

H

I

J

K

L

M

N

O

P

R

S

T

U

V

W

Y

Note: All regions used are those in force when the constituencies were created.

See also 

1974
Parliamentary constituencies
Parliamentary constituencies